Bharatiya Janata Party is the affiliate of Bharatiya Janata Party for the state of Goa. The party appointed Sadanand Tanavade as the president of the BJP Goa on 12 January 2020 who took over from Vinay Dinu Tendulkar. Pramod Sawant was sworn in as the Chief Minister of Goa on 19 March 2019, after the death of Manohar Parrikar.

Electoral history

Legislative Assembly election

Lok Sabha election

Leadership

Chief Minister

Leader of the Opposition

President

See also
 Bharatiya Janata Party
 Goa Legislative Assembly
 Maharashtrawadi Gomantak Party
 Bharatiya Janata Party, Gujarat
 Bharatiya Janata Party, Uttar Pradesh
 Bharatiya Janata Party, Madhya Pradesh
 State units of the Bharatiya Janata Party

References 

Bharatiya Janata Party
Goa
Political parties in Goa